The swimming competitions at the 2017 Southeast Asian Games in Kuala Lumpur took place at National Aquatic Centre  in Bukit Jalil. It was one of four aquatic sports at the games, along with diving, water polo, and synchronised swimming. Meanwhile, marathon swimming was held at the Putrajaya Lake.

The 2017 Games featured competitions in forty events (20 events for men and 20 events for women).

Events 
Similar to the program's format in 2015, swimming features a total of 40 events (20 each for men and women), including two 10 km open-water marathons. The following events will be contested (all pool events are long course, and distances are in metres unless stated):
Freestyle: 50, 100, 200, 400, 800 (women), and 1,500 (men);
Backstroke: 50,100 and 200;
Breaststroke: 50,100 and 200;
Butterfly: 50,100 and 200;
Individual medley: 200 and 400;
Relays: 4×100 free, 4×200 free; 4×100 medley
Marathon: 10 kilometres

Schedule

Participation

Participating nations

  (7)
  (20)
  (4)
  (23)
  (4)
  (8)
  (27)
  (23)
  (1)
  (17)

Medal summary
Singapore once again proved to be a force to be reckoned with in the swimming events. Even with the home crowd supporting Malaysia due to the location of the games, they were unbeatable to win all 6 relays. Quah Jing Wen, being in her second SEA Games, won 2 individual gold medals, beating the favorite Nguyễn Thị Ánh Viên of Vietnam in the 200 m butterfly and her sister Quah Ting Wen in the 100 m butterfly. She also combined with her sister to emerge champion in the 3 relays. The Vietnamese queen took 8 gold medals, similar to her achievement in 2015. Welson Sim won the 200 and 400 m freestyle but was unable to take the third gold in the 1500 m freestyle where two Vietnamese proved too strong and the Malaysians managed a disappointing 4th in their home ground.

Medal table

Men's events

Women's events

Notes

See also
Swimming at the 2017 ASEAN Para Games

References

External links
  
 Results Book